Expédition was originally a British civilian 16-gun cutter, either a merchantman or a privateer, that the French captured in July 1778. They brought her into French service as the corvette Expédition.

French career 
On 27 October 1778, under M. de la Jaille, Expédition captured a 16-gun British privateer.

In 1779, Expédition sailed with the frigate Surveillante. She took an incidental part in the action of 6 October 1779, and after the battle, she took Surveillante in tow.

In January 1782, under M. de Langle, Expédition departed Port Louis for a patrol. Off Isle de France, she encountered a strange sail, that she chased under a British false flag. Her quary was in fact the French transport Bethsy, under Captain Roche. Bethsy attempted to flee and seeing her pursuer gaining on him, Roche destroyed letters from Suffren before realising the mistake.

Fate 
In April 1782, Expédition was to carry despatches from Navy Minister Castrie and from  Bussy-Castelnau to the squadron under Suffren near Nagapattinam. She arrived on the Indian coast and called Tharangambadi, but instead of continuing directly, she started preying on Paraiyar merchantmen. This put her in the course of the British squadron under Hughes, which detected and chased her. Expédition deliberately ran aground between Tharangambadi and Karaikal. Her crew managed to escape, but the despatches were lost.

Notes, citations, and references

Notes

Citations

References 
 
 
 

1771 ships
Age of Sail corvettes of France
Ships built in France
Captured ships
Sloops of the Royal Navy
Maritime incidents in 1782